Hong Sung-Sik (born November 13, 1967 in Gochang, Jeollabuk-do) is a retired South Korean amateur boxer.

Career
Hong won a bronze medal in the men's Lightweight (60 kg) category at the 1992 Summer Olympics in Barcelona. He defeated future WBO lightweight champion Artur Grigorian 9–3 in Round of 16, but was edged out 11-10 by Oscar De La Hoya in the semifinal bout.

Hong retired from boxing after winning gold at the 1993 East Asian Games. He is currently serving as a junior high school physical education teacher in Gochang, Jeollabuk-do.

Results 

1990 Boxing World Cup

1992 Summer Olympics

External links
sports-reference

1967 births
Living people
Lightweight boxers
Boxers at the 1992 Summer Olympics
Olympic boxers of South Korea
Olympic bronze medalists for South Korea
Olympic medalists in boxing
Medalists at the 1992 Summer Olympics
Boxers at the 1994 Asian Games
South Korean male boxers
Asian Games competitors for South Korea
Sportspeople from North Jeolla Province